Avner Ash is a professor of mathematics at Boston College.

Ash received his Ph.D. from Harvard University in 1975 under the supervision of David Mumford.

In 2012, Ash became a fellow of the American Mathematical Society.

Works

References

Year of birth missing (living people)
Living people
Fellows of the American Mathematical Society
20th-century American mathematicians
21st-century American mathematicians
Harvard University alumni
Boston College faculty
Number theorists